The Arabuko Sokoke Forest Reserve is located on the coast of Kenya, 110 km north of Mombasa and is protected as a national Forest Reserve. The Arabuko Sokoke National Park, situated at the north-western edge of the Arabuko Sokoke Forest Reserve, is only a few square kilometres in size and constitutes only a small portion of the latter.

Protection
The National Park was gazetted only in the late 1980s and in fact straddles the Forest Reserve boundary, with about 50% lying outside the boundary. This outer section actually lies outside an electric elephant fence installed in 2006/7 and is now fully inhabited by local communities to the extent that there is no sign on the ground to show where the National Park begins or ends. The National Park doesn't add any particular protection to the forest which is the largest fragment of coastal forest (420 square km) left in East Africa.

The Forest Reserve, on the other hand, is jointly managed by the Kenya Forest Service, Kenya Wildlife Service, National Museums of Kenya and the Kenya Forest Research Institute and is one of the better protected forests in Kenya. The forest was first protected as a Crown Forest in 1943, and was gazetted in the 1960s. The forest is threatened by the desire for land by local people. Several national and international conservation organisations are working with the Kenya Wildlife Service to protect the park.

Wildlife
The Arabuko Sokoke Forest is an area of high endemism, containing endemic mammals, birds and plants. It contains three forest types, mixed forest, Brachystegia and Cynometra, each of which protects different communities of plants and animals.

It protects many endemic and near-endemic species. The Clarke's weaver is completely endemic to the forest, while the eponymous Sokoke scops owl, Sokoke pipit, and the Amani sunbird and spotted ground thrush are found only here and in a forest fragment in Tanzania. The park adjoins Mida Creek, a mangrove forest that is an important shorebird wintering ground, protecting species such as the Terek sandpiper and the crab plover.

The endearing golden-rumped elephant shrew, an endemic elephant shrew the size of a rabbit, is the most noticeable of the park's endemic mammals; the Sokoke bushy-tailed mongoose and Aders's duiker (found only here and in Zanzibar) are more elusive. The forest also has savannah elephants, African civets, as well as sokokes, baboons and vervet monkeys. The park is also recognised as an outstanding centre of amphibian diversity.

Gallery

See also
 Coastal forests of eastern Africa
 Cameraria sokoke

External links 

 Kenya Wildlife Service – Arabuko Sokoke National Park
 
 ASSETS - Arabuko-Sokoke Schools and Eco-tourism Scheme, an initiative aiming at linking forest conservation with local education
 

National parks of Kenya
Protected areas established in 1990
Coast Province
Northern Zanzibar–Inhambane coastal forest mosaic